This article is a list of political parties in Iceland. Iceland has a multi-party system with many political parties, in which often no one party has a chance of gaining power alone, and parties must work with each other to form coalition governments.

Political parties

Parliamentary representation from September 2021
Eight parties were elected at the September 2021 election. The box below shows the distribution of seats in the incumbent parliament.

Active parties, without representation in the Althing

Defunct parties

Best Party (Besti flokkurinn)
Bright Future (Björt framtið)
Citizens' Movement (Borgarahreyfingin)
Citizen's Party (Borgaraflokkurinn)
Communist Party (Kommúnistaflokkurinn)
Communist Party (Marxist–Leninist) (Kommúnistaflokkurinn (m-l))
Democracy Movement (Lýðræðishreyfingin)
Dawn (Dögun)
Home Rule Party (Heimastjórnarflokkurinn)
Households Party (Flokkur Heimilanna)
Iceland Democratic Party (Lýðræðisvaktin)
Icelandic Movement – Living Land (Íslandshreyfingin – lifandi land)
Liberal Party (Frjálslyndi flokkurinn)
National Awakening (Þjóðvaki)
Nationalist Party (Flokkur Þjóðernissinna)
National Preservation Party (Þjóðvarnarflokkurinn)
New Force (Nýtt afl)
Old Independence Party (Sjálfstæðisflokkurinn eldri)
People's Alliance (Alþýðubandalagið)
People's Unity Party – Socialist Party (Sameiningarflokkur alþýðu - Sósíalistaflokkurinn)
Rainbow (Regnboginn)
Right-Green People's Party (Hægri grænir, flokkur fólksins)
Rural Party (Landsbyggðarflokkurinn)
Social Democratic Party (Alþýðuflokkurinn)
Solidarity (Samstaða)
The Movement (Hreyfingin)
Union of Liberals and Leftists (Samtök frjálslyndra og vinstri manna)
Women's List (Kvennalistinn)

See also
Politics of Iceland
List of political parties by country

References

External links
Icelandic election statistics

Iceland
 
Political parties
Political parties
Iceland